Yesna Rijkhoff (born 9 December 1992) is a track cyclist from  Netherlands. She represented her nation at the 2015 UCI Track Cycling World Championships.

Career results

2012
3rd Team Sprint, UEC European U23 Track Championships (with Shanne Braspennincx)
2013
Grand Prix Sprint Apeldoorn
2nd Keirin
3rd Sprint
3rd Sprint, Revolution – Round 2, Glasgow
3rd Keirin, UEC European U23 Track Championships
2014
2nd Keirin, Revolution – Round 3, Manchester
2nd Team Sprint, UEC European U23 Track Championships (with Elis Ligtlee)
3rd Sprint, US Sprint GP
3rd Sprint, Champions of Sprint
3rd Scratch Race, Fastest Man on Wheels
3rd Sprint, Festival of Speed
3rd Sprint, Sprintermeeting
2015
Milton International Challenge
1st Keirin
2nd Sprint
2nd Team Sprint (with Kyra Lamberink)
Independence Day Grand Prix
1st 500m Time Trial
2nd Keirin
3rd Sprint
Grand Prix of Colorado Springs
1st Team Sprint (with Laurine van Riessen)
3rd Sprint
U.S. Vic Williams Memorial Grand Prix
1st Keirin
1st Sprint
2nd 500m Time Trial

References

External links
 profile at Cyclingarchives.com

1992 births
Dutch female cyclists
Living people
People from Hoorn
Cyclists from North Holland
21st-century Dutch women